Seliger is a name meaning "blessed man" in German and Yiddish. It may refer to:
 Lake Seliger, Russia
 Seliger Forum, a yearly Russian youth forum/camp at Lake Seliger
 Seliger Forschungs- und Entwicklungsgesellschaft mbH (Berthold Seliger research and development society)
 Seliger Rocket

Surname 
 Berthold Seliger, German rocket technical designer
 Dirk Seliger, German author, illustrator and comic artist
 Howard Harold Seliger (1924–2012), American physicist and biologist
 Kel Seliger (born 1953), Texas state senator
 Marc Seliger (born 1974), German ice hockey goaltender
 Max Seliger (1865–1920), German painter

See also 
Selig (name)
Seeliger
Seligmann, Seligman
Zelig (disambiguation)

Surnames
Yiddish words and phrases